Villar del Cobo is a municipality located in the province of Teruel, Aragon, Spain. According to the 2004 census (INE), the municipality had a population of 222 inhabitants.

See also 
 Montes Universales

References

Municipalities in the Province of Teruel